The following outline is provided as an overview of and topical guide to the history of South Asia:

History of South Asia – South Asia includes the contemporary political entities of India, Pakistan, Bangladesh, Nepal, Afghanistan, Bhutan, and the island nations of Sri Lanka and the Maldives.

Chronology

James Mill (1773–1836), in his The History of British India (1817), distinguished three phases in the history of India, namely Hindu, Muslim and British civilisations. This periodisation has been influential, but has also been criticised for the misconceptions it gave rise to. Another influential periodisation is the division into "ancient, classical, medieval and modern periods", although this periodisation has also been criticised.

Romila Thapar notes that the division into Hindu-Muslim-British periods of Indian history gives too much weight to "ruling dynasties and foreign invasions", neglecting the social-economic history which often showed a strong continuity. The division into Ancient-Medieval-Modern periods overlooks the fact that the Muslim conquests occurred gradually during which time many things came and went off, while the south was never completely conquered. According to Thapar, a periodisation could also be based on "significant social and economic changes", which are not strictly related to the change of ruling powers.

By period

Paleolithic and Mesolithic age 
 Madrasian culture ( 1.5 MYA)
 Soanian culture
(c. 500,000–125,000 BCE)
South Asian Stone Age (c. 50,000–5000 BCE)

Neolithic age 
 Bhirrana culture (7570–6200 BCE)
 Mehrgarh culture (7000–3300 BCE)

Bronze Age 
Bronze Age India (3500–1500 BCE)
 Kalibangan (3500–2000 BCE)
 Indus Valley civilization  (3300–1300 BCE)
 Early Harappan Culture (3300–2600 BCE)
 Mature Harappan Culture (2600–1750 BCE)
 Late Harappan Culture (1750–1300 BCE)
Ahar Banas culture
Copper Hoard culture
Painted Grey Ware culture
Black and red ware culture
Bara culture
Malwa culture
Jorwe culture
Other chalcolithic sites include Patapadu (Andhra Pradesh)

Iron Age and Vedic period

 Vedic period (c. 1500–600 BCE)
 Puru Kingdom (c. 1500–1200 BCE)
 Brihadratha Dynasty (c. 1700–689 BCE)
 Gandhara Kingdom (c. 1500–500 BCE)
 Kuru Dynasty (c. 1200–350 BCE)
 Panchala Dynasty (c. 1200–500 BCE)
 Avanti Kingdom (c. 1200–300 BCE)

 Later Vedic period (c. 1000–600 BCE)
 Matsya Kingdom   ( c.1000–500 BCE )
 Chedi Kingdom   ( c.1000–300 BCE)
 Surasena Kingdom   (c.1000–600 BCE)
 Kamboja Kingdom   (c. 1000–550 BCE)
Videha Kingdom    (c. 800–300 BCE)
 Pradyota dynasty   (c. 682–544 BCE)
 Haryanka Kingdom   (544–415 BCE)
 Pandyan Kingdom   (600 BCE–1650 CE)
 Chera Kingdom   (600 BCE–1102 CE)
 Chola Kingdom   (600 BCE–1279 CE)
 Ror Kingdom   (450 BCE–489 CE)
 Shishunaga dynasty   (415–321 BCE)
 Nanda Empire   (421–345 BCE)
 Malava Dynasty   (392 BCE–78 CE)
 Macedonian Empire   (330–323 BCE)
 Maurya Empire   (321–184 BCE)
 Pallava Kingdom   (250 BCE–800 CE)
 Maha-Megha-Vahana Empire   (250 BCE–400 CE)

Middle kingdoms 

 Satavahana Empire   (230 BCE–220 CE)
 Kuninda Kingdom   (200 BCE–300 CE)
 Indo-Scythian Kingdom   (200 BCE–400 CE)
 Shunga Empire   (185–73 BCE)
 Indo-Greek Kingdom   (180 BCE–10 CE)
 Kanva Empire   (75–26 BCE)
 Indo-Parthian Kingdom   (21–130s CE)
 Western Satrap Empire   (35–405 CE)
 Kushan Empire   (60–240 CE)
 Bharshiva Dynasty   (170–350 CE)
 Nagas of Padmavati   (210–340 CE)
 Sasanian Empire   (224–651 CE)
 Indo-Sassanid Kingdom   (230–360 CE)
 Vakataka Empire   (250s–6th century CE)
 Kalabhra Empire   (250–600 CE)
 Gupta Empire   (280–550 CE)
 Kadamba Empire   (345–525 CE)
 Western Ganga Kingdom   (350–1000 CE)
 Kamarupa Kingdom   (350–1100 CE)
 Vishnukundina Empire   (420–624 CE)
 Maitraka Empire   (475–767 CE)
 Huna Kingdom   (475–576 CE)
 Rai Kingdom   (489–632 CE)
 Guhila dynasty (500-1950 CE)
 Turk Shahis (500–850 CE) 
 Hindu Shahis (850–1026 CE)
 Chalukya Empire   (543–753 CE)
 Maukhari Empire   (550s–8th century CE)
 Kalachuris of Mahishmati (6th-7th century CE)
 Harsha Empire   (606–647 CE)
 Eastern Chalukya Kingdom   (624–1075 CE)
 Rashidun Caliphate   (632–661 CE)
 Gurjara-Pratihara Empire   (650–1036 CE)
 Umayyad Caliphate   (661–750 CE)
 Kalachuris of Tripuri   (7th-12th century CE)
 Pala Empire   (750–1174 CE)
 Rashtrakuta Empire   (753–982 CE)
 Paramara Kingdom   (800–1327 CE)
 Yadava Empire   (850–1334 CE)
 Chaulukya Kingdom   (942–1244 CE)
 Western Chalukya Empire   (973–1189 CE)
 Lohara Kingdom   (1003–1320 CE)
 Hoysala Empire   (1040–1346 CE)
 Sena Empire   (1070–1230 CE)
 Eastern Ganga Empire   (1078–1434 CE)
 Zamorin Kingdom   (1102–1766 CE)
 Kakatiya Kingdom   (1083–1323 CE)
 Chutiya Kingdom   (1187-1673 CE)
 Kalachuris of Kalyani   (1156–1184 CE)

Late medieval period 

Late medieval period   (1206–1596)

 Delhi Sultanate   (1206–1526 CE)
 Mamluk Sultanate   (1206–1290 CE)
 Khalji Sultanate   (1290–1320 CE)
 Tughlaq Sultanate   (1320–1414 CE)
 Sayyid Sultanate   (1414–1451 CE)
 Lodi Sultanate   (1451–1526 CE)
 Deva Kingdom   (12th century–13th century CE)
 Ahom kingdom   (1228–1826 CE)
 Chitradurga Kingdom   (1300–1779 CE)
 Reddy Kingdom   (1325–1448 CE)
 Vijayanagara Empire   (1336–1646 CE)
 Bengal Sultanate   (1352–1576 CE)
 Ilyas Shahi Sultanate (1352-1487 CE)
 Hussain Shahi Sultanate (1494-1538 CE)
 Karrani Sultanate (1564-1576 CE)
 Garhwal Kingdom   (1358–1803 CE)
 Mysore Kingdom   (1399–1947 CE)
 Gajapati Empire   (1434–1541 CE)
 Keladi Kingdom   (1499–1763 CE)
 Deccan Sultanates   (1490–1596 CE)
 Koch Kingdom   (1515–1947 CE)

Early modern period 

Early modern period   (1526–1858)

 Bengal Sultanate   (1352–1576 CE)
 Hussain Shahi Sultanate (1494-1538 CE)
 Karrani Sultanate (1564-1576 CE)
 Mughal Empire   (1526–1858 CE)
 Sur Empire   (1540–1556 CE)
 Madurai Kingdom   (1559–1736 CE)
 Thanjavur Kingdom   (1572–1918 CE)
 Marava Kingdom   (1600–1750 CE)
 Thondaiman Kingdom   (1650–1948 CE)
 Maratha Empire   (1674–1947 CE)
 Sikh Confederacy   (1707–1799 CE)
 Durrani Empire   (1747–1823 CE)
 Travancore Kingdom   (1729–1947 CE)
 Sikh Empire   (1799–1849 CE)

European colonial period 

Colonial period   (1510–1961 CE)

 Portuguese India   (1510–1961 CE)
 Dutch India   (1605–1825 CE)
 Danish India   (1620–1869 CE)
 French India   (1759–1954 CE)
 Company Raj   (1757–1858 CE)
 British Raj   (1858–1947 CE)
 Partition of British India   (1947 CE)

Kingdoms of Sri Lanka 

 Kingdom of Tambapanni   (543–505 BCE)
 Kingdom of Upatissa Nuwara   (505–377 BCE)
 Anuradhapura Kingdom   (377 BCE–1017 CE)
 Kingdom of Ruhuna   (200 CE)
 Kingdom of Polonnaruwa   (300–1310 CE)
 Jaffna Kingdom   (1215–1624 CE)
 Kingdom of Dambadeniya   (1220–1272 CE)
 Kingdom of Yapahuwa   (1272–1293 CE)
 Kingdom of Kurunegala   (1293–1341 CE)
 Kingdom of Gampola   (1341–1347 CE)
 Kingdom of Raigama   (1347–1415 CE)
 Kingdom of Kotte   (1412–1597 CE)
 Kingdom of Sitawaka   (1521–1594 CE)
 Kingdom of Kandy   (1469–1815 CE)
 Portuguese Ceylon   (1505–1658 CE)
 Dutch Ceylon   (1656–1796 CE)
 British Ceylon   (1815–1948 CE)

History of South Asia, by region 

 History of Afghanistan
 History of Bengal
 History of Bangladesh (See History of Bangladesh after independence for post-1971 history)
 History of Chittagong
 History of Dhaka
 History of Rangpur
 History of Sylhet
 History of Bhutan
 History of India for pre-1947 history.
 Timeline of Indian history
 History of Andhra Pradesh
 History of Arunachal Pradesh
 History of Assam
 History of Bihar
 History of Chhattisgarh
 History of Goa
 History of Gujarat
 History of Haryana
 History of Himachal Pradesh
 History of Jammu and Kashmir
 History of Jharkhand
 History of Karnataka
 History of Kerala
 History of Madhya Pradesh
 History of Maharashtra
 History of Manipur
 History of Meghalaya
 History of Mizoram
 History of Nagaland
 History of Odisha
 History of Punjab
 History of Rajasthan
 History of Sikkim
 History of Tamil Nadu
 History of Telangana
 History of Tripura
 History of Uttar Pradesh
 History of Uttarakhand
 History of West Bengal
 History of the Republic of India for post-1947 history
 History of the Maldives
 History of Nepal
 History of Pakistan
 Pakistan studies
 History of Azad Kashmir
 History of Balochistan, Pakistan
 History of Gilgit–Baltistan
 History of Islamabad
 History of Khyber Pakhtunkhwa
 History of the Punjab
 History of Sindh
 History of the Federally Administered Tribal Areas
 History of Sri Lanka
 History of British Indian Ocean Territory

History of South Asia, by subject 
History of architecture in South Asia

 Archaeology in India
 History of South Asian domes
 Coinage of India
 Economic history of India
 History of the taka
 History of South Asian cuisine
 Timeline of cultivation and domestication in South and West Asia
 History of education in the Indian subcontinent
 Execution by elephant
 Genetics and archaeogenetics of South Asia
 Indian literature
 Indian maritime history
 Military history of India
 List of Indian monarchs
 Indology
 Linguistic history of the Indian subcontinent
 Timeline of mathematical innovation in South and West Asia
 History of metallurgy in South Asia
 History of science and technology in South Asia

See also

 History of Asia
 History of Central Asia
 History of East Asia
 History of Southeast Asia
 Former subdivisions of Pakistan
 Partition of India
List of Hindu Empires and Dynasties

References

Notes

Citations

Sources

External links 

 1
South Asian history